Cormac Rowe (Bridgetown, County Wexford, born abt. 1983 ) is an Irish Michelin star winning head chef with Lady Helen in Thomastown, County Kilkenny Ireland

Rowe started his kitchen career in Kelly's Hotel in Rosslare. Later he went to college followed by a stint at The Park Hotel. Since 2006, Rowe works at the Lady Helen Restaurant in the Mount Juliet Hotel. He is the head chef since 2010.

Awards
 Michelin star: 2014

Personal
Cormarc Rowe is the son of Peter and Bernie Rowe.

References

Living people
Irish chefs
Head chefs of Michelin starred restaurants
Year of birth missing (living people)